Alexandria, an electoral district of the Legislative Assembly in the Australian state of New South Wales, had two incarnations, the first from 1904 to 1920, the second from 1927 to 1930.


Election results

Elections in the 1920s

1927

Bill Ratcliffe was one of five sitting MPs for Botany.

1920 - 1927

Elections in the 1910s

1917

Sitting Labor MP Simon Hickey was returned with a slightly reduced majority. Sydney Smith was a former member for East Macquarie, Bathurst, Canterbury and federal member for Macquarie.

1913

Sitting Labor MP Simon Hickey was returned with an increased majority.

1912 by-election

The by-election was caused by the death of John Dacey. Simon Hickey was Dacey's son-in-law. William Ferguson was a former member for Sturt who had been a member of Labor until switching to Liberal reform in 1904.

Elections in the 1900s

1910

Sitting Labor MP John Dacey was returned with an increased majority.

1907

Albert Bruntnell had been elected MP for Surry Hills at the 1906 by-election.

1904

Notes

References

New South Wales state electoral results by district